New Cross Gate Depot is a railway depot in New Cross, South East London. The depot is situated on the London Overground East London Line and is to the north of New Cross Gate station beside the Brighton Main Line. It replaced the smaller New Cross Depot that serviced the predecessor London Underground line.

, the depot's allocation consists of London Overground Class 378 EMUs.

History

London Underground East London Line
Light maintenance and stabling took place at the smaller New Cross depot alongside the South Eastern Main Line on the New Cross branch of the East London line, with heavier work done at Neasden Depot on the Metropolitan line. Between 1985 and 1987, D78 stock operated the line before being replaced by A60 and A62 stock. This depot closed when the line was transferred from London Underground, and was subsequently demolished.

2009/10: Construction
The current depot was constructed in 2009 to stable British Rail Class 378 stock for the new London Overground service.

2014/5: Capitalstar 378 conversion to five car units

References

Sources 
 
 

Railway depots in London
Transport in the London Borough of Lewisham